This partial list of city and municipality nicknames in the Philippines compiles the aliases, sobriquets, and slogans that cities and municipalities in the Philippines are known by (or have been known historically by), officially and unofficially, to municipal governments, local people, outsiders, or their tourism boards or chambers of commerce.

List

See also 

 List of province nicknames in the Philippines
 Lists of nicknames – nickname list articles on Wikipedia

References 

Philippines
Nicknames
Nicknames
Philippines Cities